The Papua New Guinea U-20 women's national football team is the national under-20 women's association football team of Papua New Guinea in international women's football. They are controlled by the Papua New Guinea Football Association and they are the only team besides New Zealand who have competed in a FIFA U-20 Women's World Cup, they did this when they hosted the 2016 FIFA U-20 Women's World Cup with the national team finished bottom of their group.

Records

U-20 World Cup record

OFC Championship Record

Current technical staff

Current squad
The following players were called up for the 2019 OFC U-19 Women's Championship from 30 August–12 September in Avarua, the Cook Islands.

Caps and goals updated as of 6 September 2019, after the game against Tonga.

2017 Squad
The following players were called up to for the 2017 OFC U-19 Women's Championship.

Caps and goals correct after match against Samoa on July 24, 2017.

Squad for the 2016 FIFA U-20 Women's World Cup
The following players were called up to for the 2016 FIFA U-20 Women's World Cup.

Caps and goals correct after match against North Korea on November 20, 2016.

See also
 Papua New Guinea women's national football team (Senior)
 Papua New Guinea women's national under-17 football team
 Papua New Guinea men's national under-20 football team
 Football in Papua New Guinea

References

External links
Papua New Guinea Football Federation page
Oceania Football Federation page

u-20
Oceanian women's national under-20 association football teams